Casey Paus is a former American football quarterback. He played college football for the Washington Huskies football team from 2001 to 2005. Paus started 8 of 11 games in the 2004 season, throwing for 1,476 yards, 5 touchdowns, and 17 interceptions.

Early life
Born the son of Nancy and Rick Paus, Casey prepped at Lincoln-Way High School, where he participated as a member of the football team, leading his team to a 12–1 record and a No. 3 state ranking in his senior year. Paus posted a 42–2 career record and finished career with 5,734 yards passing and 51 TDs. Paus was ranked sixth in the nation at QB by Rivals.com.

References

External links
 Profile at GoHuskies.com
 Profile at CFBStats.com

American football quarterbacks
Living people
Washington Huskies football players
People from New Lenox, Illinois
Year of birth missing (living people)